Cracker Barrel Old Country Store, Inc., doing business as simply Cracker Barrel, is an American chain of restaurant and gift stores with a Southern country theme. The company was founded by Dan Evins in 1969. Its first store was in Lebanon, Tennessee; the corporate offices are located at a different facility in the same city. The chain's stores were at first positioned near Interstate Highway exits in the Southeastern and Midwestern United States, but expanded across the country during the 1990s and 2000s. , the chain operates 663 stores in 45 states.

Cracker Barrel's menu is based on traditional Southern cuisine, with appearance and decor designed to resemble an old-fashioned general store. Each location features a front porch lined with wooden rocking chairs, a stone fireplace, and decorative artifacts from the local area. Cracker Barrel partners with country music performers. It engages in charitable activities, such as its assistance to victims of Hurricane Katrina and injured war veterans.

During the early 1990s, the company became the subject of controversy when founder and CEO Dan Evins instituted an official company policy prohibiting the hiring of any individual whose "sexual preferences fail to demonstrate normal heterosexual values." Following massive public backlash and large shareholders such as the New York City Employee Retirement System threatening to vote out the entirety of upper management, the company reversed the policy.

History

First location and early company history 
Cracker Barrel was founded in 1969 by Dan Evins, a representative for Shell Oil, who developed the restaurant and gift store concept initially as a plan to improve gasoline sales. Designed to resemble the traditional country store that he remembered from his childhood, with a name chosen to give it a Southern country theme, Cracker Barrel was intended to attract the interest of highway travelers. The name comes from the barrels of soda crackers that could be found for sale in small-town stores across the American South in the early 1900s; people would stand around the barrels chatting and catching up, similar in purpose to contemporary office water coolers.

The first restaurant was built close to Interstate 40, in Lebanon, Tennessee. It opened in September 1969, serving Southern cuisine including biscuits, grits, country ham, and turnip greens.

Evins incorporated Cracker Barrel in February 1970, and soon opened more locations. In the early 1970s, the firm leased land on gasoline station sites near interstate highways to build restaurants. These early locations all featured gas pumps on-site; during gasoline shortages in the mid to late 1970s, the firm began to build restaurants without pumps. Into the early 1980s, the company reduced the number of gas stations on-site, eventually phasing them out altogether as the company focused on its restaurant and gift sales revenues. Cracker Barrel became a publicly traded company in 1981 to raise funds for further expansion. It floated more than half a million shares, raising $10.6 million. Following the initial public offering, Cracker Barrel grew at a rate of around 20 percent per year; by 1987, the company had become a chain of more than 50 units in eight states, with annual net sales of almost $81 million.

New markets and refocus 

The company grew consistently through the 1980s and 1990s, attaining a $1 billion market value by 1992. In 1993, the chain's revenue was nearly twice that of any other family restaurant.

In 1994, the chain tested a carry-out-only store, Cracker Barrel Old Country Store Corner Market, in suburban residential neighborhoods. In addition, it expanded into new markets through the establishment of more traditional Cracker Barrel locations, the majority of them outside the South, and tested alterations to its menus to adapt to new regions. The chain added regional dishes to its menus, including eggs and salsa in Texas and Reuben sandwiches in New York, but continued to offer its original menu items in all restaurants.

By September 1997, Cracker Barrel had 314 restaurants, and aimed to increase the number of stores by approximately 50 per year over the following five years. The firm closed its Corner Market operations in 1997 and refocused on its restaurant and gift store locations. The company's president, Ron Magruder, stated that the chain was concentrating on strengthening its core theme, offering traditional foods and retail in a country store setting, with good service and country music. The chain opened its first restaurant and gift store not located near a highway in 1998, in Dothan, Alabama. In the 2000s, in the wake of incidents including charges of racial discrimination and controversy over its policy of firing gay employees, the firm launched a series of promotional activities including a nationwide book drive and a sweepstakes with trips to the Country Music Association Awards and rocking chairs among the prizes. The company has since begun expansion to the West Coast: in 2017, their first store in the region opened in Tualatin, Oregon, and their first store in California was opened the next year in Victorville.

In 2019 Cracker Barrel purchased Maple Street Biscuit Company for $36 million cash.

Operations 
The number of combined restaurants and stores owned by Cracker Barrel increased between 1997 and 2000, to more than 420 locations. In 2000 and 2001, the company addressed staffing and infrastructure issues related to this rapid growth by implementing a more rigorous recruitment strategy and introducing new technology, including an order-placement system. From the late 1990s to the mid-2000s, the company focused on opening new locations in residential areas to attract local residents and workers as customers. It updated its marketing in 2006 to encourage new customers, changing the design of its highway billboard advertisements to include images of menu items. Previously the signs had featured only the company's logo. By 2011, Cracker Barrel had opened more than 600 restaurants in 42 states. On January 17, 2012, company founder Dan Evins died of bladder cancer.

Cracker Barrel partnered with DoorDash in 2020, in response to restaurant closures due to the Covid-19 pandemic. It was the restaurant's first partnership with a delivery service. Since then, the company has continued to grow its off-premise sales, launched two virtual brands including the Pancake Kitchen and Chicken n’ Biscuits, as well as two new “Ghost Kitchens” in the Los Angeles area called Cracker Barrel Kitchen which only processes off-premise orders. In February 2021, the company announced in an earnings call that 30% of its total sales in the previous quarter came from off-premise sales, an increase of 78%.

Restaurants

Food and gift shop 

As a Southern-themed chain, Cracker Barrel serves traditional Southern comfort food often described as "down-home" country cooking and sells gift items including simple toys representative of the 1950s and 1960s, toy vehicles, puzzles, and woodcrafts. Also sold are country music CDs, DVDs of early classic television, cookbooks, baking mixes, kitchen novelty decor, and early classic brands of candy and snack foods. Breakfast is served all day, and there are two menus: one for breakfast, the other for lunch and dinner. Since the first restaurant opened, the menu has featured Southern specialties, including biscuits, fried chicken, and catfish; seasonal and regional menu items were added during the 1980s and 1990s. In 2007, Cracker Barrel announced plans to remove artificial trans fats from its menu items.

Locations, service, and decor 

For much of its early history, Cracker Barrel decided to locate its restaurants along the Interstate Highway System, and the majority of its restaurants remain close to interstate and other highways. Cracker Barrel is known for the loyalty of its customers, particularly travelers who are likely to spend more at restaurants than locals.

The locations are themed around the idea of a traditional Southern U.S. general store. Items used to decorate each store are authentic artifacts, including everyday objects from the early 1900s and after. Each location features a front porch lined with wooden rocking chairs, a wooden peg solitaire game on every table, and a stone fireplace with a deer head displayed above the mantel. Each location has five common items: a shotgun, a cookstove, a deer head, a telephone, and a traffic light. The peg games have been present in Cracker Barrel since the opening of the first store, and continue to be produced by the same family in Lebanon, Tennessee.

The decor at each location typically includes artifacts related to the local history of the area, including antique household tools, old wall calendars and advertising posters, and antique photographs. The practice began with the first location which was decorated by Lebanon, Tennessee antique store owners Don and Kathleen Singleton. The Singletons continued to be involved in decorating subsequent stores until 1979 followed by their son, Larry Singleton, who held the role until his retirement in 2019. Items acquired by the company to be used as decorations are centrally stored in a Tennessee warehouse, where they are cleaned, restored and cataloged until needed. , the facility held more than 90,000 items.

Awards 

Destinations magazine has presented the chain with awards for best chain restaurant, and in 2010 and 2011, the Zagat survey named it the "Best Breakfast". The chain was selected by the Outdoor Advertising Association of America as the 2011 OBIE Hall of Fame Award recipient for its long-standing use of outdoor advertising. It was also named the "Best Family Dining" restaurant by a nationwide "Choice in Chains" consumer poll in Restaurants & Institutions magazine for 19 consecutive years.

Fans 
From 1977 to 2017, married couple Ray and Wilma Yoder drove a combined total of more than 5 million miles to visit 644 Cracker Barrel locations. When the company opened their 645th restaurant, in Tualatin, Oregon in August 2017 (on Ray Yoder's 81st birthday), it flew the Yoders out for the grand opening and presented them with custom aprons and rocking chairs, among other gifts.

Corporate affairs

Leadership

Board of directors 
The company is run by a board of directors made up of mostly company outsiders, as is customary for publicly traded companies.  Board members are elected every year at the annual shareholders' meeting using a majority vote system.  There are five committees within the board which oversee specific matters.  These committees include the audit committee, which handles accounting issues with the company including auditing and reporting; the Compensation Committee, which approves compensation for the CEO and other employees of the company; the Governance and Nominating Committee, which handles various corporate matters including nomination of the board; the executive committee, whose chairperson is ex officio the chairman of the board; and the Public Responsibility Committee, which works to ensure the company remains compliant with all local, state, and federal laws, in addition to ensuring the company remains neutral in American politics.

On 10 July 2020, Cracker Barrel Old Country Store reported that, effective instantly, Gilbert Dávila was named to the board of directors of the company. Mr. Dávila is the founder and CEO of DMI Consulting – a major international communications, diversity & inclusion and innovation company in the United States, primarily helping Fortune 200 businesses to build competitive development strategies based on America's fastest expanding population / segment.

Executives 
Sandra B. Cochran is the CEO and president of the company. She has held the position since September 2011. Prior to this position, Cochran served as Chief Financial Officer of the company from April 2009 until November 2010 and was named Chief Operating Officer in November 2010.

Investment and business model 
Cracker Barrel restaurants are aimed at the family and casual dining market as well as retail sales. The chain also advertises to people traveling on the interstate highways, as the majority of its locations are close to highway exits. The company has promoted its cost controls to investors. The company has stated its goals are to keep employee turnover low and to provide better trained staff.  Since the 1980s, the firm has offered a formal training program with benefits for progressing through it to all of its employees.

Partnerships 
Cracker Barrel has frequently collaborated with country musician Dolly Parton. The company first worked with Parton in 2009 on the collector's edition of her album Backwoods Barbie. Since then, the company has released collector's editions of other Parton albums. It also brought together Parton and the a cappella group Pentatonix to create a remix of Parton's song Jolene, which won a grammy award for best country duo/group performance in 2017. Parton also performed as part of Cracker Barrel's appearance in the 2020 Macy's Thanksgiving Day Parade.

In 2009, the company worked with country musician Alan Jackson to release an album, called Songs of Love and Heartache, along with a collectible collection. In 2019, the company launched its 'Five Decades, One Voice' campaign, which highlighted female country music singers such as Loretta Lynn, Trisha Yearwood, and Brandi Carlile after a study found female country artists receive less radio time than male artists. The initiative included producing covers of classic country songs and creating all-female playlists for the company's restaurants.

In 2011, The Oakridge Boys recorded a 30th anniversary edition of their album "It's Only Natural" for the company. In 2020, Cracker Barrel brought together Ingrid Andress, Kimberly Schlapman, and Karen Fairchild to collaborate on a version of Andress' song "More Hearts Than Mine."

Community involvement 

Cracker Barrel has supported a wide range of charities through one-off donations, promotional events, and partnerships with charitable organizations. The chain has supported charities and causes in communities where its restaurants are located, including the Gulf Coast after Hurricane Katrina in 2005 and Nashville after severe flooding in 2010. In the same year, Cracker Barrel established Cracker Barrel Cares Inc., an employee-funded non-profit organization that provides support to Cracker Barrel employees. Cracker Barrel has also formed a partnership with the Wounded Warrior Project, a charity for injured veterans. In attempts to rebuild its image after several race-related controversies, the firm has provided a scholarship through the National Black MBA Association, and job skills programs and sponsorships with 100 Black Men of America and the Restaurant and Lodging Association.

Cracker Barrel sponsored the NASCAR Atlanta 500 race at Atlanta Motor Speedway from 1999 to 2001 and the Grand Ole Opry from 2004 to 2009. The company was the first presenting sponsor of the Grand Ole Opry. This sponsorship allowed the company to make connections within the Nashville music industry, following which it entered into partnership with a number of country music performers. The chain has established partnerships with artists including Alison Krauss, Charlie Daniels, Josh Turner, Kenny Rogers, Dolly Parton, Alan Jackson, and Alabama, to offer CD releases and merchandise.

In 1997, the company purchased the Mitchell House in Lebanon, Tennessee.  The house had been the elementary dormitory and school for Castle Heights Military Academy which both Dan Evins and his son attended.  The school had closed in 1986 and the building had sat empty since then. Cracker Barrel spent two million dollars to restore the home and used it as its corporate headquarters from 1999 to 2013.

In 2016 Cracker Barrel partnered with nonprofit Operation Homefront to launch Operation Rocker, which provided Cracker Barrel rocking chairs to families involved in Operation Homefront's Homes on the Homefront program, and Star Spangled Baby Showers, a program for expectant military families. In November 2021, Cracker Barrel launched an initiative called Food for Families aimed at addressing food insecurity, hunger and reducing food waste in rural and underserved communities and in middle Tennessee. This was in addition to a new partnership with the Cracker Barrel Old Country Store Foundation and Feeding America.

Conflict with Biglari Holdings 

The board of directors of Cracker Barrel has repeatedly been at odds with the largest shareholder, Biglari Holdings Inc.  According to SEC filings, as of 2013, Biglari Holdings controlled a 19.9% share of the company, just short of the 20% needed to trigger a shareholder rights plan, more commonly termed a "poison pill".  The poison pill was adopted after Biglari Holdings sought approval to purchase a 49.99% share of the company and join the board of directors. Sardar Biglari made another attempt to join Cracker Barrel's board in 2020, which shareholders rejected. At the time, he reportedly controlled approximately 8.7% of the company.

Biglari Holdings purchased shares of Cracker Barrel in 2011, and has often been critical of the transparency to shareholders, overspending on advertising, lack of customer value, capital funds mismanagement, and not maximizing shareholder value.  As of 2020, Biglari had made five attempts to join the board as a candidate himself or by proxy. Each attempt has been denied by a shareholder vote.  Biglari Holdings has also put forward a request for a one-time $20/share dividend to address perceived overly conservative capitalization, which was also rejected by shareholders.  Cracker Barrel has responded by claiming Biglari has a "hidden agenda" and a conflict of interest by holding shares in other restaurant chains such as Steak 'n Shake.

Controversies

LGBT policies 
In early 1991, an intra-company memo called for employees to be dismissed if they did not display "normal heterosexual values". According to news reports, at least 11 employees were fired under the policy on a store-by-store basis from locations in Georgia and other states. After demonstrations by gay rights groups, the company ended its policy in March 1991 and stated it would not discriminate based on sexual orientation. The company's founder, Dan Evins, subsequently described the policy as a mistake. From 1992 onward, the New York City Employees Retirement System, then a major shareholder, put forward proposals to add sexual orientation to the company's non-discrimination policy. An early proposal in 1993 was defeated, with 77 percent against and only 14 percent in support, along with 9 percent abstaining. It was not until 2002 that the proposals were successful; 58 percent of company shareholders voted in favor of the addition.

Cracker Barrel achieved the lowest score (15 out of 100) of all rated food and beverage companies in the Human Rights Campaign's 2008 Corporate Equality Index, a measure of LGBT workplace equality. Their score for 2011 had increased to a 55.  The 2011 survey noted that the firm had established a non-discrimination policy and had introduced diversity training that included training related to sexual orientation. However, the company's score for 2013 dropped to a 35 out of 100, not having obtained the points related to non-discrimination toward gender identity and health benefits for partners of LGBT employees and transgender-inclusive benefits. In 2019, Cracker Barrel earned a score of 80 on the index, and maintained that score in the 2020 and 2021 reports.

On December 20, 2013, Cracker Barrel announced it would no longer sell certain Duck Dynasty products which it was "concerned might offend some of [its] guests" after Phil Robertson, a star of the reality TV show, remarked in a GQ interview:

Robertson also made "comments likening homosexuality to terrorism and bestiality" in the interview, and expressed views about race which attracted criticism. On December 22, less than two days after pulling the products from its shelves, Cracker Barrel reversed its position after protests from customers.

Beginning in 2016, the company adopted a pro-LGBT stance, developing an internal diversity council which included LGBTQ members.  Since 2017, the company has sponsored Out & Equal, a workplace-equality non-profit organization.

In 2018, Cracker Barrel developed a limited edition of the chain's signature rocking chairs featuring an LGBT rainbow pattern.  The company donated these "Rainbow Pride Rockers" to various pro-LGBTQ organizations, including the Human Rights Campaign, Nashville LGBT Chamber of Commerce, Nashville Pride, and Out & Equal Workplace Summit.

In 2019, the company announced it would not permit Grayson Fritts, a Knox County, Tennessee cop and pastor at All Scripture Baptist Church who has called for the execution of LGBTQ people, to hold an event in one of its restaurants.

Race- and gender-based discrimination lawsuits 
In July 1999, a discrimination lawsuit was filed against Cracker Barrel by a group of former employees, who claimed that the company had discriminated against them on the grounds of race. In December 2001, twenty-one of the restaurant's customers, represented by the same attorneys, filed a separate lawsuit, alleging racial discrimination in its treatment of guests. Regarding both accusations, Cracker Barrel officials disputed the claims and stated that the company was committed to fair treatment of its employees and customers.

In 2004, an investigation by the U.S. Justice Department found evidence that Cracker Barrel had been segregating customer seating by race; seating or serving white customers before seating or serving black customers; providing inferior service to black customers, and allowing white servers to refuse to serve black customers. The Justice Department determined that the firm had violated Title II of the Civil Rights Act of 1964. The company was required to sign a five-year agreement to introduce "effective nondiscrimination policies and procedures." The terms included new equal opportunity training; the creation of a new system to log, investigate, and resolve complaints of discrimination; and  the publicizing of its non-discrimination policies. They were required to hire an outside auditor to ensure compliance with the terms of the settlement.
In 2006, Cracker Barrel paid a $2 million settlement to end a lawsuit alleging race and sexual harassment at three Illinois restaurants. Cracker Barrel stores subsequently began displaying a sign in the front foyer explaining the company's non-discrimination policy, and added to its website and menu the policy and details on how to make a complaint.

Since the early 2000s, Cracker Barrel has provided training and resources to minority employees to improve its image on diversity. These efforts involved outreach to minority employees, along with testing a training plan to help employees whose first language is Spanish to learn English. By 2002, minorities made up 23 percent of the company's employees, including over 11 percent of its management and executives.

Cracker Barrel is on the Corporate Advisory Board for the Texas Conference of the National Association for the Advancement of Colored People (NAACP), and is a corporate sponsor of the NAACP Leadership 500 Summit. In 2011, the company received praise from other companies and politicians like Mary Mancini for its inclusivity efforts, including its board of directors gender make up, which included three women out of 10 total board members at the time. Its chief executive officer (CEO), Sandra Cochran, is the second woman in Tennessee to hold that office in a publicly traded company.

Legal disputes

Kraft Foods vs. Cracker Barrel 
In November 2012, Cracker Barrel licensed its name to Smithfield Foods' John Morrell Division in a deal to create a line of meat products to be sold in supermarkets and through other retail channels.  In response, Kraft Foods filed a trademark-infringement lawsuit in February 2013. Kraft has sold cheese in retail stores under its Cracker Barrel brand since 1954. The corporation said that Cracker Barrel stores have not made significant sales of retail food products beyond their restaurant menu, and asked that the Smithfield Foods deal be nullified by the U.S. District Court in the Northern District of Illinois.

On November 14, 2013, in a unanimous ruling authored by Judge Richard Posner, the Seventh Circuit Court of Appeals upheld a ruling by a lower District Court judge granting an injunction against the sale of Cracker Barrel's meat products to be sold in stores.  The Seventh Circuit upheld the injunction based on the combined similarity of the parties’ marks, goods, and channels of trade: "It's not the fact that the parties' trade are so similar that is decisive, nor even the fact that the products are similar (low-cost packaged food items).  It is those similarities coupled with the fact that, if Cracker Barrel prevails in this suit, similar products with confusingly similar trade names will be sold through the same distribution channel – grocery stores, and often the same grocery stores – and advertised together."  In Judge Posner's estimation, these similarities – despite the differences in the parties’ respective logos and regardless of where the products are located in relation to each other in grocery stores – might lead consumers to "think all the Kraft products bearing the 'Cracker Barrel' name were produced in association with the Defendant." In economics this behavior is referred to as 'traditional forward confusion.'  The court further concluded the likelihood of confusion was exacerbated by the fact that both products at issue were inexpensive; thus, consumers were unlikely to scrutinize their respective labels.  In response to the ruling, Kraft Foods and Cracker Barrel made an agreement regarding the use of the Cracker Barrel name.  In exchange for Kraft dropping the trademark-infringement lawsuit, Cracker Barrel agreed to sell its products under the brand name "CB Old Country Store."

See also

References

External links 
 
 

Restaurant chains in the United States
Retail companies of the United States
Theme restaurants
Restaurants in Tennessee
Lebanon, Tennessee
Restaurants established in 1969
Retail companies established in 1969
1969 establishments in Tennessee
Companies listed on the Nasdaq
1980s initial public offerings